Brisca is the name of:

 Brisca, the popular Spanish card game

See also
 BriSCA (disambiguation)